Wasim Zazai (born 3 March 1999) is an Afghan cricketer. He made his List A debut for Kabul Province in the 2019 Afghanistan Provincial Challenge Cup tournament on 31 July 2019. He made his Twenty20 debut on 8 September 2020, for Kabul Eagles in the 2020 Shpageeza Cricket League.

References

External links
 

1999 births
Living people
Afghan cricketers
Kabul Eagles cricketers
Place of birth missing (living people)